Robert or Rob Epstein may refer to:

Rob Epstein (born 1955), American filmmaker
Robert Epstein (born 1953), American psychologist and journalist
Robert M. Epstein (born 1928), American anesthesiologist